Rafael Nadal was the defending champion, but chose not to participate that year.

Nikolay Davydenko won in the final, 6–4, 6–2, against Paul-Henri Mathieu.

Seeds
All seeds receive a bye into the second round.

Draw

Finals

Top half

Section 1

Section 2

Bottom half

Section 3

Section 4

Qualifying
The top two seeds received a bye into the qualifying competition

Seeds

Qualifiers

Draw

First qualifier

Second qualifier

Third qualifier

Fourth qualifier

Fifth qualifier

Sixth qualifier

References

External links
Main Draw
Qualifying Draw

Singles